Vilar de Andorinho is a Portuguese parish in the municipality of Vila Nova de Gaia. The population in 2011 was 18,155, in an area of 7.07 km².

See also
Saint of Vilar

References

Freguesias of Vila Nova de Gaia